Serge-Philippe Raux-Yao (born 20 May 1999) is a French professional footballer who plays as a defender for Rodez.

Career
Raux-Yao is a youth product of Cergy Pontoise and L'Entente SSG, before joining AJ Auxerre in 2017. On 6 May 2020, Raux-Yao signed with Cercle Brugge. Raux-Yao made his professional debut with Cercle Brugge as a late sub in a 3-0 Belgian First Division A loss to Charleroi on 31 October 2020.

On 31 January 2022, Raux-Yao returned to France and signed with Ligue 2 club Rodez.

Personal life
Born in France, Raux-Yao is of Ivorian descent.

References

External links

1999 births
Living people
Sportspeople from Pontoise
French footballers
French sportspeople of Ivorian descent
Association football defenders
Belgian Pro League players
Championnat National 3 players
Ligue 2 players
AJ Auxerre players
Cercle Brugge K.S.V. players
Rodez AF players
French expatriate footballers
French expatriate sportspeople in Belgium
Expatriate footballers in Belgium
Footballers from Val-d'Oise